The 2010 FIRS Men's Inline Hockey World Championships was the 16th FIRS Men's Inline Hockey World Championships, an annual international inline hockey tournament organised by the International Roller Sports Federation. It took place between 12 and 17 July 2010 in Beroun, Czech Republic. The United States team was the defending champion, having won the previous two championships.

The tournament was won by the United States, who claimed their 12th world championship title by defeating Switzerland 6–1 in the World Championship final. The Czech Republic won against France 5–2 for the bronze medal. Spain won the World Cup tournament defeating Australia 1–0. The United States' Travis Fudge was named MVP of the tournament. Australia's Dean Dunstan and Michael Smart were the tournament's leading scorer and goaltender in save percentage respectively.

Participating nations
The following 14 nations qualified for the tournament. One nation from Oceania, seven nations from Europe, three nations from North America, and three nations from South America were represented.

Group A

Group B

Group C

Group stage
Fourteen participating teams were placed in the following four groups. After playing a round-robin, the top three teams from Group A and Group B advanced to World Championship round. The last team in Group A and B advanced to the World Cup round. Teams in Group C also competed in a round-robin with the top two teams advancing to the World Championship round. The teams who finished third and fourth advanced to the World Cup round and the two teams who finished fifth and sixth are sent to compete in the 13th-14th placement game.

Group A

Group B

Group C

World Championship
The World Championship round is the top level playoff where the winning team finishes first overall for the tournament and wins the gold medal. It comprises the top three teams from Group A and B and the top two teams from Group C. The winning teams in the quarter-finals move on to compete in the semi-finals, while the losing teams are sent to the fifth-8th placement round. The two winning teams in the semi-finals advance to the gold medal game leaving the losing teams to compete for the bronze medal and third and fourth spot overall.

Bracket

Quarter-finals

Semi-finals

Bronze medal game

Gold medal game

5th-8th placement round
The 5th-8th placement round comprises the four teams who lost in the quarter-finals of the World Championship round. The teams play a qualifier against one other team, with the winners advancing to play-off for the fifth place and the losers compete against each other for seventh place.

Bracket

Qualifying round

7th-8th place game

5th-6th place game

World Cup
The World Cup round is the second level playoff in the tournament where the winner finishes ninth overall and wins the World Cup gold medal. It also acts as a placement round for the places nine to twelve. The teams compete in a semi-final with the winners moving on to compete for the World Cup gold medal and the losers competing for the World Cup bronze.

Bracket

Semi-finals

Bronze medal game

Gold medal game

13th-14th place game
The 13th-14th placement game consists of the two teams who finished last and second last in Group C. A single game is played with the winner receiving 13th place in the overall standings and the loser receiving 14th.

Ranking and statistics

Tournament awards
Individual awards:
Most Valuable Player:  Travis Fudge
Fair Play Award: 
Best Goalkeeper:  Michael Urbano
Best Defenseman:  Karel Rachunek
Best Forward:  Diego Schwarzenbach
All-Star Team:
Goalkeeper:  Michael Urbano
Defense:  Karel Rachunek
Forwards:  Brian Baxter,  Travis Fudge,  Julien Walker

Final standings

Scoring leaders
List shows the top skaters sorted by points, then goals.

Leading goaltenders
Only the top five goaltenders, based on save percentage.

See also 
 FIRS Inline Hockey World Championships
 List of FIRS Senior Men's Inline Hockey World Championships medalists

References

External links
Official site

2010 in inline hockey
2010 in Czech sport
Inline hockey tournaments
International sports competitions hosted by the Czech Republic
Inline hockey in the Czech Republic